Luz Estrella Rodríguez is a Salvadoran politician. He serves as El Salvador's Minister of Economy.

References

Living people
Government ministers of El Salvador
Year of birth missing (living people)